Mingul is a village in Gjirokastër County, southern Albania. It belongs to the former Lunxhëri municipality and is part of the wider Lunxhëri region. At the 2015 local government reform, it became part of the Gjirokastër municipality. It is situated south of Erind, and southeast of Gjatë and inhabited by an Orthodox Aromanian population with a minority of Christian Albanians.

History
The Holy Monastery of the Transfiguration of Christ, a prime example of post-Byzantine architecture, is only 30 minutes walk from the village, providing evidence that the village has been inhabited since the 17th century due to the fact that the church is estimated to have been built in 1666.
Also, the Holy Church of Archangel Michael, located within the village, (specifically in the village cemetery) was built somewhere in the 18th century.

References

Villages in Gjirokastër County
Aromanian settlements in Albania